The 1988 AFC Youth Championship were held between October 17 and October 28 in Doha, capital of Qatar. Eight teams entered the final tournament, playing for the Asian Youth title and a spot at the 1989 FIFA World Youth Championship in Saudi Arabia.

Iraq won the tournament, beating Syria 4–3 after a penalty shootout. Hosts Qatar grabbed the third place.

The Iraqi team qualified for the World Cup Finals, whereas Syria and Qatar had to enter a play-off round against Australia and New Zealand. Syria won the tournament it hosted in January 1989 in Aleppo.

Teams

Group stage

Group A

Group B

Semi finals

Third place play-off

Final

Qualification to World Youth Championship
The following teams qualified for the 1989 FIFA World Youth Championship.

  
  
  (host)

External links
 RSSSF

 
1988
Youth
1988
1988–89 in Qatari football
1988 in youth association football